is a common ward name in many Japanese cities.

 Nishi-ku, Fukuoka, in Fukuoka, Fukuoka Prefecture
 Nishi-ku, Hamamatsu, in Hamamatsu, Shizuoka Prefecture
 Nishi-ku, Hiroshima, in Hiroshima, Hiroshima Prefecture
 Nishi-ku, Kōbe, in Kobe, Hyōgo Prefecture
 Nishi-ku, Kumamoto, in Kumamoto, Kumamoto Prefecture
 Nishi-ku, Nagoya, in Nagoya, Aichi Prefecture
 Nishi-ku, Niigata, in Niigata, Niigata Prefecture
 Nishi-ku, Ōsaka, in Osaka, Osaka Prefecture
 Nishi-ku, Saitama, in Saitama, Saitama Prefecture
 Nishi-ku, Sakai, in Sakai, Osaka Prefecture
 Nishi-ku, Sapporo, in Sapporo, Hokkaido Prefecture
 Nishi-ku, Yokohama, in Yokohama, Kanagawa Prefecture

See also
 Western District (disambiguation)